Menasha Skulnik (May 15, 1890 – June 4, 1970) was an American actor, primarily known for his roles in Yiddish theater in New York City. Skulnik was also popular on radio, playing Uncle David on The Goldbergs for 19 years. He made many television and Broadway appearances as well, including successful runs in Clifford Odets's The Flowering Peach and Harold Rome's The Zulu and the Zayda.

Life and career
Born in Warsaw, Poland, Skulnik reportedly ran away at the age of 10 to join a circus. In 1913 he emigrated to the United States, and sometime after his arrival joined a Yiddish stock company in Philadelphia, where his fellow actors included Molly Picon. His diminutive stature (5'4"), high nasal voice, mannerisms and appearance, made him a natural for comedy. 

Skulnik knew exactly what he was in comedy: "I play a schlemiel, a dope. Sometimes they call me the Yiddish Charlie Chaplin, and I don't like this. Chaplin's dope is a little bit of a wiseguy. He's got a little larceny in him. I am a pure schlemiel, with no string attached." Skulnik was dubbed the "East Side's Chaplin" by the New York Evening Journal in 1935.

He collapsed on stage in New Haven, Connecticut, during a dress rehearsal of a show he was bringing to Broadway, and died several weeks later on June 4, 1970, in New York City. He is buried in the Yiddish theater section of the Mount Hebron Cemetery.

Stage
In a Tenement House (1932)
God Man and Devil (1935)
The Perfect Fishel (1935)
Laugh Night (1936)
Schlemihl (1936)
Yossel and His Wives (1937)
The Little Tailor (1938)
The Wise Fool (1938)
Mazel Tov, Rabbi (1938)
Three Men and a Girl (1939)
The Fifth Season (1953)
The Flowering Peach (1954)
Uncle Willie (1956)
The 49th Cousin (1960)
The Zulu and the Zayda (1965)
Chu Chem (1966)

Radio
Abie's Irish Rose
The Goldbergs

Television
Menasha the Magnificent (1950)

References

External links

1890 births
1970 deaths
Donaldson Award winners
Yiddish comedians
Yiddish theatre performers
Jewish American comedians
Male actors from New York City
Polish emigrants to the United States
Comedians from New York City
20th-century American comedians
Yiddish-language satirists
Jewish American male comedians
Jewish Polish comedians
Burials at Mount Hebron Cemetery (New York City)
20th-century American Jews